"Hey Kid" is a song by English singer-songwriter Matt Willis, released on August 14, 2006 as the second single from his debut solo album Don't Let It Go to Waste.

The lyrics of this song are about the days after Busted, Willis' original band, split.

This song features two music videos, one being the main video and the other to fit the story of the teen film John Tucker Must Die, in which the song appears in.

On August 20, the song entered the UK top 75 at No. 61, based solely on download sales. The following week it climbed to No. 11 due to the physical release of the single.

The B-side "Me and Your Mother" was also featured on Willis' debut album as a hidden track.

The song also appears in the 2006 action spy film Stormbreaker.

Track listing

Charts

Weekly charts

Year-end charts

References

2006 songs
2006 singles
Matt Willis songs
Songs written by Jason Perry (singer)
Songs written by Julian Emery
Songs written by Matt Willis
Mercury Records singles